CHWA-FM is a Canadian radio station, which broadcasts at 102.1 FM in Watson Lake, Yukon. Owned by the Liard First Nation FM Society, the station broadcasts a community radio format for First Nations in the region.

CHWA also has a rebroadcaster in Upper Liard, operating on 99.9 FM with the call sign VF2330.

External links
 CRTC Decision 1997-558

Radio stations in Yukon
First Nations radio stations in Canada